Garuda Indonesia Flight 421 was a scheduled domestic flight operated by Indonesian flag carrier Garuda Indonesia travelling about  from Ampenan to Yogyakarta. On January 16, 2002, the flight encountered severe thunderstorm activity during approach to its destination, suffered flameout in both engines, and ditched in a shallow river, resulting in one fatality and several injuries.

Aircraft and crew
The aircraft, a Boeing 737-3Q8, registration PK-GWA, was manufactured in 1988 and delivered in 1989. It was the first 737 flown by Garuda Indonesia. On this flight, it was flown by Captain Abdul Rozaq (44), and First Officer Harry Gunawan (46). Captain Rozaq had logged 14,020 flight hours including 5,086 hours on the Boeing 737. First Officer Gunawan had 7,137 flight hours.

Accident
As the Boeing 737-300 aircraft was on approach to its destination, the pilots were confronted with substantial thunderstorm activity visible ahead and on their onboard weather radar. They attempted to fly between two intense weather cells visible on their radar. They later entered a thunderstorm containing heavy rain and hail. About 90 seconds later, as the aircraft was descending through , both CFM International CFM56 engines experienced a flameout, which resulted in the loss of all generated electrical power. Both engines were set at their flight-idle power setting before flameout occurred. The crew tried unsuccessfully to restart the engines two or three times. They then tried but failed to start the auxiliary power unit (APU), at which time total electrical power loss occurred. (During the later investigation, the NiCd battery was found to have been in poor condition due to inadequate maintenance procedures.) First Officer Gunawan attempted to transmit a Mayday call, but was unable to. The ditch procedure was successful, leaving the aircraft settled down on its belly in the shallow water, with the fuselage, wings and control surfaces largely intact. There was no fire.

Evacuation and rescue
Only two doors were available for evacuation. Residents of nearby villages assisted. Uninjured passengers and their personal belongings were temporarily sheltered in a nearby empty house, while injured passengers were transported by an available vehicle to the nearest clinic. After evacuation, the pilot contacted the Jogja Tower via cellphone and reported the emergency landing and location. The rescue team arrived about two hours later and all remaining passengers and crew were taken safely to a hospital.

Aircraft damage and injuries
There was severe damage to the submerged aircraft belly, especially near the tail, leading to the inference that it landed nose high with tail impacting the shallow river bed, which ripped away the cabin floor together with the two flight attendants seated there.  Both were found with severe injuries in the river behind the aircraft, and one did not survive.  Twelve passengers suffered injuries, while the flight crew and other two flight attendants were injured. The aircraft was written off as a total loss, making the accident the 11th hull loss and eighth fatal accident involving the Boeing 737-300.

NTSC investigation and report
The final report of the Indonesian National Transportation Safety Committee (NTSC) notes that pilot training in the interpretation of weather radar images was not formal, being given only during flight training.  It is considered possible that the precipitation was so dense that it attenuated the radar signals, reducing the reflections that usually indicate precipitation and making such high density appear to be a clearer path.  Had the crew manipulated the radar tilt to sweep the ground during descent, they would have been aware of the risks associated with the chosen flight path.  Intense noise audible in data from the cockpit voice recorder as well as damage to the nose radome and engines indicate the presence of hail with the rain. The report concludes that the hail/water density exceeded the engine tolerance at flight idle, resulting in flameout.

Remarks by U.S. NTSB
A later Safety Recommendation letter from the U.S. NTSB to the FAA notes that analyses of flight recorder data and weather satellite images indicate that the aircraft had already entered a thunderstorm cell at the start of the diversion to avoid the storm.  It also notes that the procedure recommended in the Boeing 737 Operations Manual to respond to a dual flameout is to first start the APU (which could then provide much more power to start the main engines).  Furthermore, repeating a comment in the NTSC report, the letter notes Boeing's advice that, in moderate to severe rain, starting main engines can take up to three minutes to spool up to idle, whereas the pilots allowed only one minute before initiating another retry. However, the battery on the stricken aircraft was found to have been faulty, holding only 22 volts before the flameout occurred when a fully charged battery should have 24 volts. The fact that the battery was faulty before the flameout meant the pilots’ futile attempts to restart the engines all but drained the remaining power from an already damaged battery, resulting in there being no power to start the auxiliary power unit, which explains the total loss of electrical power, even after the plane left the storm. There was simply no power to restart the engines or start the APU. The letter from the NTSB also recommends to the FAA that pilots be advised to maintain a higher engine power level in moderate to severe precipitation to avoid flameout.

Aftermath
Garuda Indonesia no longer operates this route in 2005. It still uses the flight number GA-421, but on the Denpasar – Jakarta route instead, operated by an Airbus A330 or a 777-300ER. Garuda Indonesia also funded local road construction nearby the accident area and also built a multipurpose hall and reservoir facility in thanks for local villagers' assistance when evacuating.

Dramatization
The crash was dramatized in the 16th season of the TV series Mayday – also re-packaged as Air Disasters – in an episode entitled "River Runway".

It is featured in season 1, episode 1, of the TV show Why Planes Crash.

See also

TACA Flight 110 – Similar incident with same aircraft type, dual engine flameout when passing through thunderstorm
Transair Flight 810 - Similar incident with same aircraft type, engine failures leading to ditching
US Airways Flight 1549 – Similar incident, dual engine flameout due to birdstrike leading to ditching
Southern Airways Flight 242 – Similar incident involving a DC-9, dual engine flameout due to rain/ hail ingestion
Water landing
Emergency landing
CFM56 engine design flaw – Engine flaw involving flameout after intake of heavy amounts of rain/ hail

References

External links
Final report (Alternate) – National Transportation Safety Committee (Archive)
Safety Recommendation (Alternate) – National Transportation Safety Board (Archive)
Aviation Safety Network accident description

Accidents and incidents involving the Boeing 737 Classic
Airliner accidents and incidents caused by engine failure
Airliner accidents and incidents involving ditching
Aviation accidents and incidents in 2002
Aviation accidents and incidents in Indonesia
Flight 421
Solo River
2002 in Indonesia
January 2002 events in Asia